Hamilton Union Church Rectory is a historic church rectory at 2267 Western Turnpike in Guilderland, Albany County, New York.  It was built in 1857 and is in the Greek Revival style.

It was listed on the National Register of Historic Places in 1982.

References

Religious buildings and structures completed in 1857
Houses on the National Register of Historic Places in New York (state)
Houses in Albany County, New York
National Register of Historic Places in Albany County, New York
1857 establishments in New York (state)